Khirt may refer to:
Khirt, Azerbaijan
Khirt, Iran